$avvy is a 2021 American documentary film directed by Robin Hauser, written by Jessica Floum. It follows the historical, cultural, and societal norms around women and money. Haley Sacks, Carrie Schwab, Farnoosh Torabi, and Sallie Krawcheck appear in the film.

The film had its world premiere at the Santa Barbara International Film Festival on April 1, 2021.

References

External links
 

2021 films
2021 documentary films
American documentary films
Documentary films about women
2020s English-language films
2020s American films